Marika Vicziany is a professor of Asian Political Economy at Political and Social Inquiry (PSI), Monash University. She is a Former Director of the Monash Asia Institute at Monash University, Melbourne, Victoria, Australia. A PhD from SOAS, University of London, she is an expert in South Asian studies. Her current research interests include regional and human security, rise of India and China and the cultural and religious issues particularly related to Hinduism and Islam.

She has published extensively on India, South Asia and China. She is currently the President of South Asian Studies Association of Australia (SASA). She has worked and published significantly on the city of Bombay, now known as Mumbai. Her works on Mumbai include communal violence, terrorism, social exclusion and the life and livelihood of women. She has also worked on the Koli Tribe that have been marginalised in the city. Her research on Mumbai demonstrates critical intersection of political economy, religion, secularism and identity that exists in the financial and dream capital of India.

References 
1. South Asian Studies Association of Australia (SASA)<http://sasaa.org.au>
2. Mobile Phones Offer Indian Women a Better Life, New York Times, May 22, 2012,  <https://www.nytimes.com/2012/05/23/world/asia/23iht-letter23.html?_r=1>
3. Mobile Phone Access and Usage Among Female Micro-Entrepreneurs in Bombay City Today, ASAA Conference, Melbourne, 2008 <https://web.archive.org/web/20120526152127/http://arts.monash.edu.au/mai/asaa/aneelababaretal.pdf>
3. Terrorism in Bombay and India's Historical Amnesia: Comparing 1993 and 2008, Australia India Institute <http://www.aii.unimelb.edu.au/tiffintalks/bombay-bombings-comparing-1993-2008-prof-marika-vicziany>
4. Terrorism in Bombay City, Centre for Dialogue, La Trobe University, 
<http://www.latrobe.edu.au/dialogue/assets/downloads/vicziany-seminar.pdf>
5. Regional Security In The Asia Pacific: 9/11 and After, Edward Elgar, 2004 
<http://www.e-elgar.co.uk/bookentry_main.lasso?currency=UK&id=3128>

External links
 Monash Asia Institute
 Marika Vicziany faculty profile

Year of birth missing (living people)
Living people
Alumni of the University of London
Academic staff of Monash University